Wolf Isaac Ladejinsky (March 15, 1899 – July 3, 1975) was an American Georgist agricultural economist and researcher, serving first in the United States Department of Agriculture, then the Ford Foundation and later the World Bank. He was a key adviser on land reform to the governments of several Asian countries, including Japan from 1945 to 1954 (during the Occupation) as well as Mainland China and later Taiwan under Chiang Kai-shek, South Vietnam from 1955 to 1961 under Ngo Dinh Diem, and countries in Southeast Asia and the Indian subcontinent. His efforts in Japan and Taiwan were a striking success, but later efforts were frustrated. Improving the welfare of Asian farmers through agrarian reform was his goal throughout his long career, earning him praise as "no typical bureaucrat, but an impassioned reformer" .

Biography
Born into a Jewish family in Katerynopil, Ukraine in 1899, Ladejinsky fled Soviet Ukraine in 1921 as a refugee from the Russian Revolution . He arrived in the US in 1922 and graduated from Columbia University six years later. In 1933 one of his professors at Columbia, Rexford Tugwell, helped him obtain a post in the Department of Agriculture. Two years later he joined the department's Foreign Agricultural Service, specializing in Asian problems. In 1945 he was assigned to General Douglas MacArthur's  SCAP staff in occupied Japan , where he played a major role in developing and introducing the land reform program that dismantled a power structure dominated by wealthy landlords. However, Ladejinsky has stated that the real architect of reform was Socialist , former Japanese Minister of Agriculture . His influence with Chiang Kai-shek in Taiwan is widely credited with aiding the Taiwan Miracle.

In December 1954, during the period of McCarthyism in the United States, Ladejinsky was the central figure in a highly public incident which aroused furor among liberals in Congress and was resolved by the intervention of the White House . Ladejinsky, an anti-Communist New Deal Democrat, was blacklisted by several conservative groups . While working as an agricultural attaché in Tokyo, his position was transferred from the Department of State to the Department of Agriculture's jurisdiction. Soon thereafter, his security clearance was revoked, and he was fired by Secretary of Agriculture Ezra Taft Benson, who considered Ladejinsky a "security risk" despite admitting a lack of hard evidence against him . A public statement charged that Ladejinsky "required clearance from the Communist Party" to work for Amtorg Trading Corporation, for whom he served briefly as a translator in 1930. At that time he also had three sisters living in Soviet Russia, which was cited as making him  "subject to coercion". The final charge was that Ladejinsky had been a member of two Communist front organizations, including the Washington Committee for Democratic Action .

The result was a public outcry. Members of the press repeatedly questioned President Eisenhower regarding the Ladejinsky case at a news conference held on January 12, 1955, particularly focusing on the fact that Ladejinsky was almost immediately chosen by Harold Stassen at the Foreign Operations Administration to direct the land reform program in South Vietnam, giving him full security clearance in order to fill a position even more sensitive than his previous one .

One quoted Benson as having "branded Ladejinsky flatly as a member of two Communist front organizations, and as an economist analyst, and investigator for Amtorg, the Russian trading agency" . John Allison, the U.S. Ambassador to Japan, protested the firing. Author James Michener wrote a letter to the New York Times stating "It is precisely as if Richard Nixon and Adlai Stevenson were to be charged with subversion. Mr. Ladejinsky is known throughout Asia as Communism's most implacable foe."

Notes

References

 . 
 . World Wide Web facsimile by The Dwight D. Eisenhower Memorial Commission of the print edition.
 .
 .
 .
.  
.
 .
 . Gerhard Peters (database).
 . Gerhard Peters (database).

Further reading
 .
.
.
 .

1899 births
1975 deaths
American people of Ukrainian-Jewish descent
Georgist economists
Columbia University alumni
Ukrainian Jews
Jewish anti-communists
People from Cherkasy Oblast